Eskandan (also Romanized as Eskandān; also known as Iskandan and Iskania) is a village in Sahand Rural District, in the Central District of Osku County, East Azerbaijan Province, Iran. According to the 2006 census, its population was 837, in 231 families.

References 

Populated places in Osku County